The Musée dauphinois (Dauphinois Museum), located in Grenoble (France), is dedicated to the ethnography, archaeology, history and society of the former province of the Dauphiné. Situated above the neighbourhood of Saint-Laurent in the listed historic monument of Sainte-Marie d’en-Haut, the Musée dauphinois is an accredited “Musée de France“ (Museum of France) and takes part in the Long Night of Museums.

Founded in 1906, the Musée dauphinois was the third museum in Grenoble, after the Musée-bibliotèque (Museum Library) and the Musée d’histoire naturelle (Natural History Museum). The museum has occupied two different historical 17th century buildings: the former chapel of Sainte-Marie d’en-Bas from 1906 to 1968 and the present site of the former convent of Sainte-Marie d’en-Haut.

Each year its temporary exhibition spaces welcome a wide range of exhibitions, creating an important centre for regional culture in Grenoble. In 2004, a temporary exhibition exploring the treasures of Ancient Egypt helped the museum to surpass the important milestone of 100,000 annual visitors.

History of the museum 

On 13 October 1905 the regional newspaper, La Dépêche dauphinoise, reported that a commission had met to study the creation of a history museum in Grenoble. On 27 January 1906, a report written by the municipal architect was sent to the mayor of Grenoble, Charles Rivail, about construction work to establish an ethnographic museum in the chapel of Sainte-Marie d’en-Bas. Later that year, on the 14th of December, the advisory commission elected one of its 12 members, the ethnographer Hippolyte Müller, as the first curator of this museum.  The name Musée dauphinois, suggested by commission member and archivist Auguste Prudhomme, was chosen by the commission on 25 March 1907. Various decisions regarding the functioning and organisation of the museum, for example, the pricing, were also made. Following the deliberation of the municipal council on 13 April 1908, a presidential decree was signed by Armand Fallières on 6 April 1910 offering a provisional loan of 4,800 francs to the city of Grenoble to pay for the museum's installation costs.

The museum was first located in the chapel of Sainte-Marie d’en-Bas, rue Très-Cloîtres, which originally belonged to the sisters of the Order of the Visitation of Holy Mary. In 1647, owing to the lack of space in the convent situated above the city, the sisters built a new convent and chapel on the left bank of the Isère River, naming it Sainte-Marie d’en-Bas.

The chapel was entirely rebuilt in 1786 but then fell into disuse after the vote on the 1905 French law on the Separation of the Churches and the State. It was in this chapel, engraved in 1907 with the inscription Musée dauphinois, that Hippolyte Müller gathered objects and documents related to the daily life of the inhabitants of the Alps — from its industrial heritage to its regional decorative arts, stretching from the Gallo-Roman period to the 19th century. In the summer of 1921, Müller and his counterpart at the Musée de Grenoble (Museum of Grenoble), Andry-Farcy, agreed to divide these objects between the two museums. In 1921, all small objects of architectural interest were transferred to the Musée dauphinois, with larger items such as the Gallo-Roman gravestones arriving the following year. These gravestones were displayed on a closed-off terrace, which is now a wide staircase. As an expert on local heritage, Mülller helped to build a life-sized replica of the alpine village of Saint-Véran in 1925 during the International Exhibition of Hydropower and Tourism in Grenoble. 

However, faced with a growing collection, the lack of space in the museum soon became evident and, by the end of the 1940s the museum had started to consider finding larger premises. The director of the “Musées de France” (Museums of France) appealed to the then mayor, Léon Martin, to find “more dignified [space] for a city of great tourism like Grenoble”. In 1949, the site of the disused convent of Sainte-Marie-d'en-Haut on the right bank of the river was suggested as a possible location; however, the relocation project would take almost two decades to complete.

Helped by favourable economic conditions and the upcoming 10th Winter Olympic Games in the city, the new town council, led by Hubert Dubedout, decided to relocate the museum to the much larger site of Sainte-Marie d’en-Haut in 1965.

On 3 February 1968, the museum, now in the partially restored former convent, was unveiled by the Minister of Cultural Affairs, André Malraux. The next day, Mayor Hubert Doubedout presented the location of the museum to General Charles de Gaulle using a giant model of the city.

After its first exhibition, which welcomed 36,000 visitors, the museum was closed for a few months in order to finish the restoration of the building. Finally, on 27 June 1970 and with the convent fully restored, the museum opened for a second time. Under its new curator Jean-Pierre Laurent during the 1970s, visitors to the museum discovered an exhibition pace that was designed personally by the curator.

In 1989, the museum acquired a new 2,000m2 building along the quay of the Isère River that provided a new workshop and storeroom close to the museum. In 1992, responsibility for the Musée dauphinois passed from the city of Grenoble to the departmental council of the Isère, where it became a service of the Direction of Culture and Heritage.

In 2004, the museum set its record for the highest number of annual visitors with 107,398 museum goers, largely thanks to an exhibition on the treasures of Ancient Egypt that coincided with the 9th International Congress of Egyptologists in Grenoble. In 2012, the museum welcomed 92,997 visitors; however, average annual visitor rates are usually around 60,000. In 2016, visitor numbers rose to 76,413 visitors.

In 2017, the Musée dauphinois, with the collaboration of the Musée de la Révolution française and the Musée de l'Ancien Évêché, took part in L’année Lesdiguières (The year of Lesdiguières), a retrospective about the dynasty of powerful men in the Dauphiné during the 11th and 12th century that was concluded by a conference from 25 to 27 October.

On 6 February 2018, to mark the opening of an exhibition celebrating the 50th anniversary of the Winter Olympic Games in Grenoble, the museum welcomed various sporting heroes from the era such as Jean-Claude Killy, Marielle Goitschel, Alain Calmat, Léo Lacroix, Patrick Péra, Guy Périllat and Franco Nones. In October 2019, the President of the Department of the Isère announced plans to redevelop the museum gardens in 2021 during the celebration of the 400th anniversary of the laying of the first brick of the convent.

History of the former convent of Sainte-Marie d’en-Haut

Origin of the convent 
The Convent of the Order of the Visitation of Holy Mary was founded during the Counter-Reformation of the 17th century. The congregation, reserved for women, was created in 1610 by Saint Francis de Sales and Saint Jane Frances de Chantal who established the order's fourth house in Grenoble, naming it the convent of Sainte-Marie d’en-Haut. 

In 1619, the construction of the fortifications on the Bastille hill, ordered by the Duke of Lesdiguières, was completed. Just three months later, on 21 October, the first brick of the convent was laid along the montée Chalemont (the Chalemont Climb) on the lower slopes of this hill in the presence of the Bishop Alphonse de La Croix de Chevrières and the young Christine of France, who had recently married the Crown Prince of Savoy. The convent was completed in the autumn of 1621. Two centuries earlier, the montée Chalemont had been the principal gateway into the city. However, this former Roman road had been replaced by a new road that cut into the cliff face on the bank of the Isère. A new gate, Porte de France (Gate of France), was constructed by Lesdiguières in 1620 to mark this new road into the city.

The various occupants of the convent 
Over the years, this convent welcomed a series of occupants. In 1791, during the French Revolution, it became a national asset and was transformed into a jail for anti-revolutionaries, including important local figures such as Chérubin Beyle, father of the writer Stendhal, the lawyer and politician Antoine Barnave, the cabinetmaker Jean-François Hache, the Chartreux Fathers and refractory priests. In 1804, nuns of the Order of the Holy Heart led by Philippine Duchesne settled in the convent and devoted their time to educating young girls until their departure in 1832. The following year, the sisters of the Providence of Corenc established a primary school in the building.

On 1 December 1851, the Ursulines arrived at the convent where they stayed until their expulsion in April 1905. The fixtures and furnishings of the convent were put up for public auction that same month. After being acquired by the city of Grenoble, the building was used as army barracks from 1906 to 1920. Severely lacking housing in the city, the city of Grenoble would then use the former convent to house 150 Italian families until the late 1950s. The building was then briefly occupied by students from the Grenoble School of Architecture, before renovated by the city in 1966.

The building and the chapel 

Most of the convent has been preserved, such as the cloister, the choir where the Visitandine nuns attended masses from behind a metal grating, and the richly-decorated baroque chapel. This chapel is accessible by a long, vaulted corridor ending in the nuns’ choir, which was built at right angles to the chapel to ensure that the nuns were invisible to the worshipers. Jane Francis de Chantal was kneeling in front of the choir's grating on 16 December 1622 when she received the revelation of Francis de Sales’ death.

A veritable museum with the museum, the Chapel of the Visitation is a jewel of French baroque art. The murals, by painter Toussaint Largeot, were completed in 1662, coinciding with the celebrations of the beatification of Francis de Sales organised by the Jesuit father Claude-François Ménestrier. The ceiling is decorated with many religious scenes that delivered spiritual messages to the worshipers during the 17th century. Among these scenes is that of the laying of the first stone of the convent. However, over time, the significance and meaning of these paintings have been lost, making it necessary to install an interactive multimedia guide to unlock the mysteries of the Order of the Visitation of Holy Mary. The chapel also contains a gilded wooden altarpiece whose construction began in 1622 thanks to the generosity of François de Bonne de Créqui, Governor of Grenoble and Lesdiguières’ grandson. The altar was built a century later by the Tuscan sculptor François Tanzi in 1747 to celebrate the beatification of Jane de Chantal. A small lateral chapel is decorated with pictures depicting the life of Francis de Sales.

In 1890, the residents of Grenoble wanted, like those in other cities, to have a statue of the Virgin Mary to watch over and protect the town. The statue would be named Notre-Dame d’en-Haut. Alfred Berruyer, architect of the renowned La Salette basilica, was commissioned to build a 30-metre tower topped with a 3.6 metre golden statue of the Virgin Mary made from cast iron and weighing 1.8 tonnes. Below this monumental statue, on each corner of the tower, were four statues that represented the patron saints of the city: Saint Bruno, Saint Ferjus, Saint Francis de Sales and Saint Hugh. With the addition of the tower, the building was reopened on 25 October 1891, in the presence of the Bishop of Grenoble, Amand-Joseph Fava. However, a few decades later, alarming cracks started to appear in the roof of the chapel due to the weight of this new tower. To prevent the chapel from collapsing, it was decided in 1935 that the tower would be demolished, with the demolition taking place on 18 January 1936. Unfortunately these four statues disappeared and only that of Saint Francis de Sales has been rediscovered. The statue was found in the garden of a private clinic on rue Thiers that was closing down on.

On 19 June 1936, the chapel was listed as a historical monument.

The gardens 

The cloister garden, with its small hedges bordering four square lawns, is typical of 17th century garden design. A multiface sundial, dating from 1793,  was installed in the centre of the garden in 1968 when the museum moved to its current premises. A second sundial can also be found under the arcade. Eighty centimetres high and sculpted from rock during the Gallo-Roman period, this sundial represents the heavenly vault and divides the day from sunrise to sunset into 12 hours. In 2013, it was temporarily transferred inside the museum for an exhibition on sundials from the Isère department. Another day-to-day object is also displayed in the cloister: a grain measurer made from stone ordered by the audit chamber of the Dauphiné to be placed in the market town of Voreppe. Gravestones with epitaphs dating from the Gallo-Roman period of Cularo, the Gallic name for Grenoble, can also be found under the arcades. These gravestones come from the first archaeological museum of Grenoble in the neighbourhood of Saint-Laurent, which was founded in 1853.

To the east of the museum terraced garden descend along the montée Chalemont. Originally vineyards and vegetable gardens, these terraces, situated 30 metres above the old town, now offer exceptional panoramic views to its visitors. On 5 July 2013, in these gardens, the museum unveiled a new variety of rose created in honour of the historian and figure of the French resistance, Rose Valland.

These terraces, as well as the museum building, were listed as historical monuments on 3 November 1965.

The collections and the library resource centre 
The museum's collections document the history of the men and women of the former province of the Dauphiné and, more broadly, the French Alps. The collections contain:

 more than 100,000 objects — from the first flint stone cut during the prehistoric period to the latest generation of snowboards;
 160,000 photographes, of which 1,000 are autochromes;
 22,000 iconographic documents: drawings, prints, posters, maps and postcards;
 1,400 films;
 2,000 audio recordings: interviews about  skills, traditions and dialects;
 and more than 20,000 works of art, both old and new.

The Musée dauphinois holds the archival collection of alpinist and geodesist, Paul Helbronner, comprising, among other objects, of 15,000 glass plates forming 360° panoramic photographs taken from all the Alpine summits.

The museum's collection continues to grow thanks to donations, objects found at archaeological digs and new purchases, such as Théodore Ravanat's oil painting, Chemin de la Grande Chartreuse par la vallée du Grésivaudan, on display at the museum's entrance, acquired in 2019.

Since 2007, the museum has embarked on a digitalisation campaign. Since then, 70,000 items have been digitally documented. A selection of these bibliographic records can now be accessed through the Isére Departement's collection portal (portail des collections du Département de l'Isère).

Since 1998, the museum has also co-edited with the publishing house Glénat, L’Alpe, a magazine devoted to the Alpine region.

The exhibitions 

The museum is formed of five floors with the former chapel and the nun's choir making up the lower ground level. The ground floor is formed of the reception, a series of temporary exhibition spaces, the cloister and the terraced gardens. The first floor also offers of temporary exhibition spaces. The second floor is reserved for long-term exhibitions and the third floor is currently occupied by a permanent exhibition dedicated to the history of winter sports.

The exhibitions at the museum examine social issues, including current. The museum offers three permanent exhibitions: Gens de l'alpe, Le rêve blanc and Sainte-Marie d'en-Haut. Il y a quatre siècles. Each season, the museum organises two temporary exhibitions. These exhibitions are accompanied by a series of events centred around sculpture and live performances (theatre, dance, story-telling and various concerts — baroque, classical, world, contemporary music as well as jazz — are regularly held in the Visitation Chapel), conferences and documentary screenings. Each exhibition is also the subject of a publication. The full catalogue of these publications can be found on the museum's website.

Permanent exhibitions 

The museum offers three permanent exhibitions. L'épopée des sports d'hiver dans les Alpes retraces the history of winter sports and replaced the previous permanent exhibition La Grande Histoire du ski in April 2018. The second permanent exhibition, Gens de l'alpe, first opened in 1998 and remodelled in 2006, displays hundreds of ethnographic items linked to the daily life of people living in the mountains. The exhibition Sainte-Marie d'en-Haut. Il y a quatre siècles explores the history of the former convent and chapel.

Temporary exhibitions since 1990 

 Hymne au parfum (January 1990 - February 1990)
 Pays, paysans, paysages du Vercors (May 1990 - September 1990)
 Inventer le monde. Les rhônalpins et leurs langages (May 1990 - November 1991)
 Bijoux berbères du Maroc. Traditions juives et arabes, au creuset du monde berbère (October 1990 - March 1991)
 Gaëtan Gatian de Clérambault. Psychiatre et photographe (October 1990 - December 1990)
 Premiers princes celtes (November 1990 – August 1991)
 Médinas et ksours. Une culture millénaire (February 1991 – March 1991)  
 Les champs de la ville. Grenoble et ses campagnes (May 1991 – June 1993)
 Icônes roumaines sur verre. Art sacré populaire des XVIII et XIXe siècle. (December 1991 - April 1992)
 Présentation de l'automate "Les joueurs de cartes" (December 1991 - January 1992)
 Passion bergers, cloches et sonailles. Usages et fabrication (March 1992 - June 1992)
 Homo turisticus. Cent ans de tourisme ordinaire en montagne (May 1992 - December 1992)
 L'homme et les alpes (October 1992 - January 1993)
 Des grecs. Les grecs de Grenoble. Les costumes de la Grèce traditionnelle (March 1993 - January 1994)
 Le temps des rafles (April 1993 - June 1993)
 Les années noires. La répression à Grenoble durant l'occupation (April 1993 - January 1994)
 Tibet en exil. Le Dalaï Lama et le bouddhisme tibétain (October 1993 - January 1994)  
 Potiers en Isère. XIXe-XXe siècles (October 1993) 
Chevaliers paysans de l'an mil au lac de Paladru (October 1993- May 1996)
 Le cinéma à cent ans ! Cent ans de cinéma en Isère (April 1994 - October 1994)
 Le balcon de Belledonne. Photographies de Francis Helgorsky (June 1994 - January 1995)  
 Patrimoine en Isère. Pays de Vizille (October 1994 - December 1994)  
 Hommage aux paysans de montagne. Photographies de Jean-Pierre Bonfort (April 1995 - September 1995)  
 Nos villages ont cinq mille ans (June 1995 - October 1995)  
 Premiers alpins. Des derniers chasseurs de la préhistoire aux premiers paysans (September 1995 - January 1997)  
 Patrimoine en Isère. Pays de Domène (December 1995 - January 1996)  
 L'image de l'autre dans la photographie. L'immigration en France vue par 45 photographes (February 1996 - April 1996)
  
 La différence. Trois musées. Trois regards (February 1996 - October 1996)  
 Les maîtres de l'acier. Histoire du fer dans les alpes (October 1996 - December 1998)  
 Patrimoine en Trièves (February 1997 - May 1997)
 D'Isère et d'Arménie. Histoire d'une communauté (April 1997 - June 1999)
 Épreuves d'Arménie. Photographies de Guy Martin-Rave  (April 1997 - June 1999)
 Hache. Ébénistes à Grenoble (October 1997 - March 1999)
 Entre l'eau et la lumière. Les hommes de l'hydraulique. Une création photographique de Anne-Marie Louvet (December 1997 - April 1998)
 Les alpes à l'affiche (November 1998 - January 1999)
 Corps de classe. Une création photographique de Catherine Poncin (March 1999 - October 1999)  
 Patrimoine en Chambaran (December 1999 - March 2000) 
 Racines (June - December 2000)
 Pour que la vie continue - D'Isère et du Maghreb, mémoires d'immigrés (October 1999 - December 2000)
 Peurs bleues. L'enfant et les croquemitaines (April 2000 - April 2001)
 Les millénaires de Dieu. Une vielle histoire pleine d'avenir(November 2000 - December 2001)
 Patrimoine en Oisans (October 2001 - December 2001)
 Potiers et faÏenciers en Dauphiné (October 2001 - January 2003)
 Les géographes inventent les Alpes. Deux siècles de géographie alpine (December 2001 - January 2003)
Martinotto frères. Photographes à Grenoble (June 2002 - January 2003)
 Les Alobroges. Gaulois et Romains du Rhône aux Alpes (October 2002 - September 2003)
Art post'alpe. La correspondance de 200 artistes postaux autour du bestiaire alpin (January - March 2003)
Transhumance. Éte 1951. Sur la route des alpages (March - July 2003)
 Français d'Isère et d'Algérie (May 2003 - September 2004)
 Un air de famille. Berriat à Grenoble, Tevézáros à Budapest. Deux quartiers de villes en changement (October 2003 - March 2004)
 Patrimoine en Isère / Pays de Roussillon (December 2003 - June 2004)
 Hippolyte Müller. Aux origines de la préhistoire alpine (May 2004 - May 2006)
 Trésors d'Égypte. La  « Cachette » de Karnak (September 2004 - January 2005), in homage to Georges Legrain and coinciding with the 9th International Congress of Egyptologists.
 Germaine Tillion. Itinéraire et engagements d'une ethnologue (February - May 2005)
 Louis Mandrin. Malfaiteur ou bandit au grand cœur ? (May 2005 - March 2006)
 Papetiers des alpes. Six siècles d'histoire. (October 2005 - July 2007)
 Le monde n'est pas un panorama (April - June 2006)
 Le Musée dauphinois a cent ans ! (October 2006 - June 2008)
 Êtres fantastiques. De l'imaginaire alpin à l'imaginaire humain (October 2006 - June 2008)
Rester Libres ! Les expressions de liberté. Des allobroges à nos jours (June - September 2007)
 Contez les boutons - Installation - Évenement (June - September 2007)
Eugénie Goldstern 1884-1942. Être ethnologue juive dans l’Europe alpine des deux guerres (November 2007 - June 2008)
 Premiers bergers des Alpes. De la préhistoire à l'Antiquité (April 2008 - June 2009)
Être ouvrier en Isère. XVIIIe-XXIe siècle (October 2008 - January 2010)
 Rompre le silence. Mémoires de chômeurs et précaires en Isère. 1975-2008 (November 2008 - January 2009)
 Habiter (April 2009 - June 2010)
 Tibétains. Peuple du monde (October 2009 - January 2011)
 Matrice (May - September 2010)
Vaucanson et l’homme artificiel. Des automates aux robots (April 2010 - June 2011)
 Sur les bords de la rivière Sangha (February 2011)
 Les anneaux de la mémoire (April 2011)
 Désert en fête (June - August 2011)

 Ce que nous devons à l'Afrique (October 2010 - January 2012)
 Hannibal et les Alpes. Une traversée, un mythe (April 2011 - July 2012)
 Un air d'Italie. La présence des Italiens en Isère (November 2011 - January 2013)
 Cœur d'ouvriers. Un travail photographique de Bernard Ciancia (December 2011 - September 2012)
 Voyage dans ma tête. La collection d'Antoine de Galbert (March - July 2012)
 L'Isère en relief. Les maquettes monumentales des fortifications de Grenoble et de Fort Barraux (October 2012 - January 2013)
 Chambre noire pour amateurs éclairés. Collection photographique Flandrin (November 2012 - September 2013)
 Angèle, Suzanne, Martine et moi... (September 2013 - January 2014)
 Bretelles et fabulations (February - June 2014)
 Les dessous de l'Isère. Une histoire de la lingerie féminine (March 2013 - September 2014)
Caractères d'altitude. Portraits sonores et photographiques des Écrins (Co-production with the Écrins National Park and the Centre de l'oralité alpine – General Council of the Hautes-Alpes) (October 2013 - May 2014)
Voir midi à sa porte. Cadrans solaires de l'Isère (December 2013 - January 2015)
À l'arrière comme au front. Les Isérois dans la Grande Guerre (March 2014 - June 2015)
[K]rânes42. La catacombe artistique (December 2014 - December 2015)
 Confidences d'outre-tombe. Squelettes en question (December 2014 - January 2016)
 Premières couleurs. La photographie autochrome (May - September 2015)
 Grenoble 1925, La grande mutation (December 2015 - September 2016)
 Tsiganes. La vie de bohème ? Six siècles de présence en Isère (October 2015 - January 2017)
 Nunavik. En terre Inuit (March 2016 - January 2017)
 Portrait large. Paysages sensibles du Pays voironnais. Photographes de Thierry Bazin (October 2016 - February 2017)
 Life. Affiches de Kazumasa Nagai (November 2016 - January 2017)
 Si on chantait ! La La La La ... (December 2016 - January 2018)
 Alpes là ! (March - October 2017)
 Lesdiguières, le prince oublié (October 2017 - July 2018)
 Pop en France. Portraits d'artistes 1967-2017 (November 2017 - June 2018)
 Grenoble 1968. Les Jeux olympiques qui ont changé l'Isère (February 2018 - October 2019)
Des samouraïs au kawaii. Histoire  croisée du Japon et de l’Occident (October 2018 - June 2019)
 L'ivresse des sommets. Eaux-de-vie, liqueurs et autres breuvages des Alpes (March 2019 - November 2020)
 Enclosed, Tony Manent (June - December 2019)
 Rose Valland. En quête de l'art spolié (November 2019 - June 2020)
 Refuges alpins. De l'abri de fortune au tourisme d'altitude (June 2020 - June 2021)

The museum's curators

Getting here 

 By public transport: Bus route 40
 By car: Rue Maurice-Gignoux leads from the quai Perrière and climbs the Bastille hill to the museum. It is worth mentioning that rue Maurice-Gignoux, honouring the geologist, is the only naturally sloping road in the city.
 By foot: Climb the steps of the montée Chalemont that start at place de la Cymaise opposite the Saint-Laurent bridge in the neighbourhood of Saint-Laurent.

References

Bibliography 
 Duclos Jean-Claude, Cent ans, Ed. Musée dauphinois, Département de l'Isère, Grenoble, 2006 
 Huss Valérie (dir.), Martinotto Frères, photographes à Grenoble [exposition]. Ed. Conseil général de l'Isère - Musée dauphinois, 2002, 120 p.
 Huss Valérie (dir.), Louis Mandrin, malfaiteur ou bandit au grand cœur ? [exposition]. Ed. Conseil général de l'Isère - Musée dauphinois, 2005, 144 p.
 Huss Valérie, Blumenfeld-Chiodo Zoé (dir.), Chambre noire pour amateurs éclairés. Photographies de la collection Flandrin [exposition]. Ed. Conseil général de l'Isère - Musée dauphinois, 2012, 104 p.
 Huss Valérie (dir.), Premières couleurs. La photographie autochrome. Ed. Département de l'Isère - Musée dauphinois, 2015, 120 p.
 Laurent Jean-Pierre - Entretiens avec Mireille Gansel, ...Et l'Homme se retrouve, Cheminements Muséographiques, Ed. Département de l'Isère - Coll. Musée dauphinois, 2008 
 Jospin Jean-Pascal (dir.), Hippolyte Müller, Aux origines de la Préhistoire alpine, Ed. Département de l'Isère - Musée dauphinois, 2004 
 Spillemaecker Chantal, Sainte-Marie d’en-Haut à Grenoble. Quatre siècles d’histoire. Ed. Département de l'Isère - Musée dauphinois, 2010  

D
D
D
Local museums in France
1906 establishments in France